NJOI is a Malaysian free-to-view satellite and digital television service launched on 18 February 2012 in collaboration with the government of Malaysia and Astro. It was officially announced by former Prime Minister of Malaysia, Najib Razak on 20 December 2011. At launch, the service provided 18 television channels and 19 radio stations. However, existing Astro customers may purchase this service through separate account. 

At launch, the set-up which consist of a set-top box, Out-Door Unit (ODU) satellite dish, smartcard and remote control unit, was available at a one-time payment of RM 305 at all Astro authorised retailers, with a standard installation fee of RM 100 from an Astro-authorised installer as stated on the website. In mid-2013, the one-time payment was reduced to RM 280, and installation remains at RM 100. The platform uses prepaid card method where one can pay for the day and amount for the prepaid channels that one wants to watch. The decoder's HDMI output is locked out and this leaves users with composite signal and component video output. However, certain decoders with updated firmware are able to use the HDMI output.  NJOI launched of its first HD channel, channel 300 (Xi Yue HD), on 1 February 2015. In 2016, the recommended retail price has been set at RM285 (inclusive of GST). RM350 (excluding RM100 installation) had been the new price of new set from 1 February 2017. On 1 October 2017, the total price has been set at RM355. Njoi's main competitor would be Sirius TV satellite provider, which would be launched in Q4 2019. Its digital terrestrial antenna based DTT service competitor is myFreeview, which was launched in 2019.

See also
 Television in Malaysia
 Digital television in Malaysia

References

External links
 Official website of NJOI

2011 establishments in Malaysia
Television in Malaysia
Astro Malaysia Holdings
Satellite television